Wilfredo Coto (12 October 1917 – 1 December 1993) was a Cuban sports shooter. He competed in the 50 m rifle event at the 1948 Summer Olympics.

References

1917 births
1993 deaths
Cuban male sport shooters
Olympic shooters of Cuba
Shooters at the 1948 Summer Olympics
Sportspeople from Havana
Cuban emigrants to the United States
20th-century Cuban people